The 2017 International Tournament of Spain was the 42nd edition of the International Tournament of Spain, 16th edition with the name of Memorial Domingo Barcenas, held in Irun, Spain, 6–8 January as a friendly handball tournament organised by the Royal Spanish Handball Federation as a preparation of the host nation to the 2017 World Men's Handball Championship.

Results

Round robin
All times are local (UTC+01:00).

Final standing

References

External links
RFEBM Official Website

International Tournament of Spain
2017 in Spanish sport
Handball competitions in Spain
2016–17 in Spanish handball